Michael Phillips (born March 11, 1961) is an American film critic for the Chicago Tribune newspaper.

Early life 
Phillips was born in Kenosha, Wisconsin, and spent most of his early years in Racine.

Career
Prior to being film critic for the Chicago Tribune, Phillips was the drama critic of the Tribune; the Los Angeles Times; the St. Paul Pioneer Press; The San Diego Union-Tribune; and the Dallas Times Herald.

From 2006 through August 2008, he appeared frequently on At the Movies with Ebert & Roeper, first as one of numerous guest critics filling in for the late Roger Ebert while he was on medical leave, and becoming a semipermanent cohost with Richard Roeper in the months before Roeper and Ebert ended their association with the series.  On August 5, 2009, Phillips was hired along with New York Times critic A. O. Scott to replace hosts Ben Lyons and Ben Mankiewicz. The show was cancelled after one season due to low ratings, concluding its run in August 2010.

More recently Phillips has introduced films as a guest host of Turner Classic Movies in 2011, 2013, 2016 and early 2017. He appears on the Filmspotting podcast, and hosts a series of programs about movie music, The Film Score, for WFMT-FM (98.7).

Preferences
In an interview with Rotten Tomatoes, Phillips listed his five favorite films (in chronological order): 

 The Passion of Joan of Arc
 His Girl Friday 
 Citizen Kane
 The Band Wagon
 Taxi Driver

Best films of the year
Each year, Phillips prepares a list of the top ten films of the year. In 2009, he also made a list for the films of the 2000's decade.

Filmography

References

External links
 
 Michael Phillips at the Chicago Tribune

1961 births
American columnists
American film critics
National Society of Film Critics Members
American television personalities
Living people
Writers from Chicago
People from Kenosha, Wisconsin
Writers from Racine, Wisconsin
20th-century American journalists
American male journalists